Kennedy was an electoral district of the Legislative Assembly in the Australian state of Queensland.

History
In 1864, the Additional Members Act created six additional electoral districts, each returning 1 member:
 Clermont
 Kennedy
 Maryborough
 Mitchell
 Rockhampton
 Warrego

The first elections in these six electorates were held in 1865 (that is, during a parliamentary term and not as part of a general election across Queensland). The nomination date for the election in Kennedy was 18 February 1865 and the election was held on 18 March 1865.

When first constituted, Kennedy covered an area from Cardwell to Mackay, west to the Great Dividing Range, taking in the entire Burdekin River system. The district covered the north Queensland coast from Mackay to Hinchinbrook Island. It was named for the explorer Edmund Kennedy.

Kennedy shrank in size over time; it finally included only the rural surrounds of Townsville. It was abolished in the 1949 redistribution (taking effect at the 1950 elections), most of its area being included in the Haughton.

Members for Kennedy
The members for Kennedy were:

See also
 Electoral districts of Queensland
 Members of the Queensland Legislative Assembly by year
 :Category:Members of the Queensland Legislative Assembly by name

References

Former electoral districts of Queensland
1865 establishments in Australia
1950 disestablishments in Australia
Constituencies established in 1865
Constituencies disestablished in 1950